The 2008 Vodafone New Zealand Music Awards took place on 8 October at the Vector Arena in Auckland. Straitjacket Fits were induced into the New Zealand Music Hall of Fame. The Technical awards took place on 3 September.

Awards and nominees
Winners are listed first and highlighted in boldface.

Multiple winners included Flight of the Concords and Opshop, who each received four awards.

Key
 – Non-technical award
 – Technical award

Performances
Performances on the night included the following:
 Cut off your Hands
 Anika Moa
 Tiki Taane 
 Scribe
 Julia Deans, Anika Moa, Lani Purkis and Greta Anderson performed a version of Legacy Award winner Straitjacket Fits' "Fast Women".

References

New Zealand Music Awards
Music Awards
Aotearoa Music Awards
October 2008 events in New Zealand